A face cord is an informal measurement for stacked firewood, sometimes called a rick.

Width and height is typically the same as a cord, but the depth can vary. The front face is the same as a cord , hence the name.

In the United States, several states only allow wood to be sold by the cord or fractions of a cord, to avoid confusion among consumers.

The wood should be stacked "racked and well stowed" – meaning stacked so that the wood is parallel, and air gaps are minimized.  It should not be cross-stacked (alternating directions), as this adds considerable empty space to the stack.

Common volumes for a face cord
 4 feet x 8 feet x 12 inches = 1/4 cord (32 cubic feet)
 4 feet x 8 feet x 16 inches = 1/3 cord (42.66 cubic feet)
 4 feet x 8 feet x 24 inches = 1/2 Face cord (64 cubic feet)

References

Firewood
Customary units of measurement in the United States
Units of volume